Clarkesvillia  is a genus of Upper Ordovician westonocerids that differs from Faberoceras in having a more flattened venter and from the later Glyptodendron in having a more ventrally located siphuncle.

References

 Teichert, C. 1964. Nautiloidea -Discosorida. Treatise on Invertebrate Paleontology Part K    Teichert and Moore, eds. 
  Clarkesvillia-Paleobiology DB

Prehistoric nautiloid genera
Discosorida